Golden Eagle Award for Best Supporting Actor also known as Best Performance by an Actor in a Supporting Role(Chinese name:中国电视金鹰奖最佳男配角,1983–1999). Since 2000, the category was retired. Until 2022, this category will be awarded again.

Winners and nominees

2020s

2000s

1990s

1980s

References

External links
Past Winners of Golden Eagles

Chinese television awards
Supporting Actor